Arisan! (English: The Gathering) is a 2003 Indonesian comedy-drama film directed by Nia Dinata, who also co-wrote the screenplay with then-unknown Joko Anwar. At the 2004 Indonesian Film Festival, it won the Citra Awards in five major categories: Best Picture, Best Actor, Best Supporting Actor, Best Supporting Actress, and Best Editing. Arisan! was the first Indonesian film to feature two men kissing, portrayed by the characters Sakti (Tora Sudiro) and Nino (Surya Saputra).

In May 2006, a television series based on the film premiered on ANTV. A sequel, Arisan! 2, was released in December 2011, continuing the story after the events in the television series.

Synopsis 
A successful architect, Sakti (Tora Sudiro), is uncertain about his sexuality, but when he meets magnetic and gay Nino (Surya Saputra), he realizes he prefers men. When Meimei (Cut Mini), one of Sakti's closest female friends, reveals she's attracted to Nino, it causes complications in their social circle. Weighing whether or not to come out of the closet, Nino is mindful of fragile Meimei, who's dealing with the breakup of her marriage.

Cast 
 Cut Mini as Meimei
 Surya Saputra as Nino
 Tora Sudiro as Sakti
 Aida Nurmala as Andien
 Rachel Maryam as Lita
 Lili Harahap as Grace
 Aurora Yahya as Fanny
 Wilza Lubis as Nuri
 Nico Siahaan as Ical
 Tika Panggabean as Massage Therapist
 Jajang C. Noer as Psychiatrist
 Ria Irawan as Yayuk Asmara
 Indra Birowo as Rama
Joko Anwar as Restaurant Manager

Production 
During an interview with The Jakarta Post film critic Joko Anwar, Nia Dinata asked him to co-write a screenplay about a group of friends in urban Jakarta after Anwar impressed her with his filmmaking aspirations. The two co-wrote the screenplay for what would become Arisan! and received a Citra Award nomination for Best Screenplay.

Dian Sastrowardoyo and Nicholas Saputra made an uncredited cameo as a man and a woman in an art gallery scene.

Reception 
It is often credited with reviving the Indonesian film industry after a decade of setback along with Ada Apa dengan Cinta? and Petualangan Sherina. At the 2004 Citra Award, the film received 5 awards out of 11 nominations.

Arisan! received much attention for being the first Indonesian film with gay theme as well as the first Indonesian film to use high-definition color enhancement. It uses a mixture of English, standard Indonesian, and Jakartan urban slang. Upon release, it garnered controversy for its depiction of homosexuality in its home Muslim-majority country of Indonesia.

Trivia 
'Arisan' is a common term for a regular social gathering between friends and relatives who chip in money to be won in turns through a lucky draw. From villagers in far-flung areas to urban professionals in big cities, arisan was initially born as a type of support network among Chinese-Indonesian merchants before becoming popular among general Indonesians, particularly housewives. In bigger cities, 'arisan' has also grown into a platform to exhibit wealth with strict criteria for participation.

Awards and nominations

Sequel 
A sequel, written and directed by Dinata and featured the same principal cast, titled Arisan! 2, was released in December 2011.

References

External links 
 Official website
 

Citra Award winners
2003 films
2003 comedy-drama films
Best Film Citra Award winners
2000s Indonesian-language films
Indonesian LGBT-related films
Films shot in Indonesia
Indonesian comedy-drama films
Gay-related films
2003 LGBT-related films
LGBT-related comedy-drama films